Twenty-three quarterbacks have started at least one game for the Baltimore Ravens of the National Football League. Six of those quarterbacks have started at least one playoff game for the Ravens. These players are listed in order of the date of each player's first start at quarterback for the Ravens.

Quarterback starts (by season)

The number of games started during the season is listed in parenthesis to the right of the player's name; playoff starts are listed as wins–losses.

Most games as starting quarterback
Accurate as of week 13 of the 2022 NFL season.

Regular season

Playoffs

Team Career Passing Records 
Accurate as of week 13 of the 2022 NFL season.

Regular season

Playoffs

See also
 List of NFL starting quarterbacks

References
 Baltimore Ravens Franchise Encyclopedia

Baltimore Ravens
Baltimore Ravens players
quarterbacks